Martin Klyne (born March 6, 1957) is a Canadian senator and former corporate executive. Klyne was appointed to the Senate of Canada in September 2018. He is a Cree Métis citizen. After obtaining his degree from the University of Regina ('86) in business administration with a major in finance, he quickly became a manager with the Mercantile Bank of Canada, currently known as Toronto-Dominion Bank, and continued his career from there.

Education 
Klyne graduated from the University of Regina with distinction with a degree in business administration, majoring in finance in 1986.

Career

RCMP Heritage Centre 
Klyne served as the chief executive officer for the centre from March 2017-August 2018. Klyne focused on the further development of the centre to continue the legacy of the Royal Canadian Mounted Police.

Queen City Sports and Entertainment Group 
From May 2015-January 2017, Klyne was the chief operating officer for the Regina Pats Hockey Club, where he focused on the operations of the organization with the president of the hockey club, while working with John Paddock, the general manager of hockey operations.

First Nations University of Canada 
Klyne was an instructor and sessional lecturer for the university from January 2013-May 2015. He taught many courses, ADMN 406 and ADMN 100.

Regina Leader-Post and The StarPhoenix 
During his term, Klyne managed the operations of two major newspapers in Saskatchewan. He also built the one of the best operating performances for Canadian newspaper markets when compared to larger newspaper market across Canada.

References 

Canadian senators from Saskatchewan
Independent Canadian senators
Politicians from Regina, Saskatchewan
First Nations politicians
Cree people
Living people
21st-century Canadian newspaper publishers (people)
Canadian corporate directors
Canadian chief executives
Canadian sports executives and administrators
1957 births
Indigenous Canadian senators